The gender of God can be viewed as a literal or as an allegorical aspect of a deity.

In polytheistic religions, gods often have genders which would enable them to sexually interact with each other, and even with humans.

Abrahamic religions worship a single God, which in most interpretations of Yahweh, God the Father, and Allah, is not believed to have a physical body. Though often referred to with gendered pronouns, many Abrahamic denominations use "divine gender" primarily as an analogy to better relate to the concept of God, with no sexual connotation. In Christian traditions with the concept of the Trinity, Jesus is believed to be a physical manifestation called God the Son, who is male. In Mormonism, God the Father is male and is married to the female Heavenly Mother.

Abrahamic religions 
In the Hebrew and Christian Bible, God is usually described in male terms in biblical sources, with female analogy in Genesis 1:26-27, Psalm 123:2-3, and Luke 15:8-10; a mother in Deuteronomy 32:18, Isaiah 66:13, Isaiah 49:15, Isaiah 42:14, Psalm 131:2; and a mother hen in Matthew 23:37 and Luke 13:34, although never directly referred to as  being female.

Judaism 

Although the gender of God in Judaism is referred to in the Tanakh with masculine imagery and grammatical forms, traditional Jewish philosophy does not attribute the concept of sex to God. At times, Jewish aggadic literature and Jewish mysticism do treat God as gendered. The ways in which God is gendered have also changed across time, with some modern Jewish thinkers viewing God as outside of the gender binary. Guillaume Postel (16th century), Michelangelo Lanci (19th century), and Mark Sameth (21st century) theorize that the four letters of the personal name of God, YHWH, are a cryptogram which the priests of ancient Israel would have read in reverse as huhi, “heshe,” signifying a dual-gendered deity.

Christianity 

Most Christian groups conceive of God as Triune, believing that God the Father, God the Son, and God the Holy Spirit are distinct persons, but one being that is wholly God.

God the Son (Jesus Christ), having been incarnated as a human man, is masculine. Classical western philosophy believes that God lacks a literal sex as it would be impossible for God to have a body (a prerequisite for sex). However, Classical western philosophy states that God should be referred to (in most contexts) as masculine by analogy; the reason being God's relationship with the world as begetter of the world and revelation (i.e. analogous to an active instead of receptive role in sexual intercourse). Others interpret God as neither male nor female.

The Catechism of the Catholic Church, Book 239, states that God is called "Father", while his love for man may also be depicted as motherhood. However, God ultimately transcends the human concept of sex, and "is neither man nor woman: He is God."

In contrast to most other Christian denominations, The Church of Jesus Christ of Latter-day Saints (LDS Church) teaches that God the Father, God the Son, and the Holy Spirit are physically distinct while being one in purpose. Some LDS Church members also believe that God the Father is married to a divine woman, referred to as "Heavenly Mother." Humans are considered to be spirit children of these heavenly parents.

The Holy Spirit 

In Hebrew language, in rabbinic literature, the divine presence of God, the Holy Spirit, the word Shekhinah is grammatically feminine, though the word is always used in a masculine or androgynous context to refer to a divine manifestation.

The New Testament also refers to the Holy Spirit as masculine in a number of places, where the masculine Greek word "Paraclete" occurs, for "Comforter", most clearly in the Gospel of John, chapters 14 to 16. These texts were particularly significant when Christians were debating whether the New Testament teaches that the Holy Spirit is a fully divine person, or some kind of "force." All major English Bible translations have retained the masculine pronoun for the Spirit, as in John 16:13. Although it has been noted that in the original Greek, in some parts of John's Gospel, the neuter Greek word pneuma is also used for the Spirit.

Islam 

Islam teaches that God (Allah) is beyond any comparison, and thus God is beyond any gender attributes. Arabic only possesses gendered pronouns ("he" and "she") but does not have gender neutral pronouns ("it"), and "he" is typically used in cases where the subject's gender is indeterminate. Thus, Allah is typically referred to as "he", despite not having any gender attributes.

The Baha'i Faith 

In the Baha'i Faith, Baha'u'llah uses the Mother as an attribute of God: "He Who is well-grounded in all knowledge, He Who is the Mother, the Soul, the Secret, and the Essence". Baha'u'llah further writes that "Every single letter proceeding out of the mouth of God is indeed a Mother Letter, and every word uttered by Him Who is the Well Spring of Divine Revelation is a Mother Word, and His Tablet a Mother Tablet." The Primal Will of God is personified as the maid of heaven in the Baha'i writings.

Indian religions

Hinduism 

In Hinduism, there are diverse approaches to conceptualizing God and gender. Many Hindus focus upon impersonal Absolute (Brahman) which is genderless. Other Hindu traditions conceive God as androgynous (both female and male), alternatively as either male or female, while cherishing gender henotheism, that is without denying the existence of other Gods in either gender.

The Shakti tradition conceives of God as a female. Other Bhakti traditions of Hinduism have both male and female gods. In ancient and medieval Indian mythology, each masculine deva of the Hindu pantheon is partnered with a feminine who is often a devi.

The oldest of the Hindu scriptures is the Rigveda (2nd millennium BC). The first word of the Rigveda is the name Agni, the god of fire, to whom many of the vedic hymns are addressed, along with Indra the warrior. Agni and Indra are both male divinities.

The Rigveda refers to a creator (Hiranyagarbha or Prajapati), distinct from Agni and Indra. This creator is identified with Brahma (not to be confused with Brahman, the first cause), born of Vishnu's navel, in later scriptures. Hiranyagarbha and Prajapati are male divinities, as is Brahma (who has a female consort, Saraswati).

There are many other gods in the Rigveda.
They are "not simple forces of nature," and possess "complex character and their own mythology."
They include goddesses of water (Āpaḥ) and dawn (Uṣas), and the complementary pairing of Father Heaven and Mother Earth.
However, they are all "subservient to the abstract, but active positive 'force of truth' [Ṛta]…which pervades the universe and all actions of the gods and humans."
This force is sometimes mediated or represented by moral gods (the Āditya, e.g. Varuṇa) or even Indra.
The Āditya are male and Ṛta is personified as masculine in later scriptures (see also Dharma).

In some Hindu philosophical traditions, God is depersonalized as the quality-less Nirguna Brahman, the fundamental life force of the universe. However, theism itself is central to Hinduism.

While many Hindus focus upon God in the neutral form, Brahman being of neuter gender grammatically, there are prominent Hindu traditions that conceive God as female, even as the source of the male form of God, such as the Shakta denomination. Hinduism, especially of the Samkhya school, views the creation of the cosmos as the result of the play of two radically distinct principles: the feminine matter (Prakṛti) and the masculine spirit (Purusha). Prakṛti is the primordial matter which is present before the cosmos becomes manifest. Prakṛti is seen as being "the power of nature, both animate and inanimate. As such, nature is seen as dynamic energy" (Rae, 1994). Prakriti is originally passive, immobile and pure potentiality by nature . Only through her contact with the kinetic Purusha she unfolds into the diverse forms before us. The idea of Prakṛti/Purusha leads to the concept of the Divine Consort. Almost every deva of the Hindu pantheon has a feminine consort (devi).

Sikhism

Other

Unificationism 
Unificationism views God, the Creator, as having dual characteristics of masculinity and femininity. Since an artist, like God, can only express that which is within the boundaries of their own nature, and according to Genesis 1:27, “So God created mankind in his own image, male and female he created them.”, indicating that God’s image includes both male and female attributes.

Due to the more active role of masculinity, mankind typically portrays God as male, but the more receptive or supportive and nurturing role within God’s characteristics is less emphasized or even neglected or ignored in writings and in art.

Animist religions 
Animist religions are common among oral societies, many of which still exist in the 21st century. Typically, natural forces and shaman spiritual guides feature in these religions, rather than fully-fledged personal divinities with established personalities. It is in polytheism that such deities are found. Animist religions often, but not always, attribute gender to spirits considered to permeate the world and its events. Polytheistic religions, however, almost always attribute gender to their gods, though a few notable divinities are associated with various forms of epicene characteristics—gods that manifest alternatingly as male and female, gods with one male and one female "face", and gods whose most distinctive characteristic is their unknown gender.

Feminist spirituality 
In her essay "Why Women Need the Goddess", Carol P. Christ argues the notion of there having been an ancient religion of a supreme goddess. The essay was first presented in the spring of 1978 as a keynote address for the "Great Goddess Re-emerging" conference at the University of California, Santa Cruz. Christ also co-edited the classic feminist religion anthologies Weaving the Visions: New Patterns in Feminist Spirituality (1989) and Womanspirit Rising (1979/1989), the latter of which include her 1978 essay.

See also 
 Ardhanarishvara
 Feminism
 Gender and religion
 Gender in Bible translation
 Goddess
 Goddess movement
 "God Is a Girl" (2002)
 "God Is a Woman" (2018)
 Radha Krishna
 Sky father
 The Hebrew Goddess
 Thealogy

References

Notes

Verses

Citations

Further reading 
 Berke, Matthew. 1996. "God and Gender in Judaism." First Things 64:33–38.
 Dorff, Elliot N. 1984. Male and Female God Created Them: Equality with Distinction. University Papers. Los Angeles: University of Judaism. pp. 13–23.
 Eller, Vernard. 1982. The Language of Canaan and the Grammar of Feminism. Grand Rapids, MI: William B Eerdmans Publishing Company.
 Harlow, Jules. 1997. "Feminist Linguistics and Jewish Liturgy." Conservative Judaism 49:3–25.
 Johnson, Elizabeth. 1984. "The Incomprehensibility of God and the Image of God Male and Female." Theological Studies 45:441–65.
 Platinga, Alvin Carl. 2000. "God, Arguments for the Existence of." Routledge Encyclopedia of Philosophy. London: Routledge.
Sameth, Mark. 2020. Our Father, Who Art Our Mother: The (Open) Secret Queer History of God | Religion Dispatches
 Swinburne, Richard G. 1995. "God." In The Oxford Companion to Philosophy, edited by T. Honderich. Oxford: Oxford University Press.

External links 

 God as Mother (A Christian view)
 The Spirit and the Bride
 God and Gender in Judaism
 Mouser, William E. "Is God Masculine? ". International Council for Gender Studies, 2007.

Conceptions of God
Feminist theology
Gender and religion
Deities by gender